The American Tennis Association (ATA) is based in Largo, Maryland, outside Washington, D.C., and is the oldest African-American sports organization in the United States.  The core of the ATA's modern mission continues to be promoting tennis as a sport for black people and developing junior tennis players, but the ATA welcomes people of all backgrounds.

History

By the early 1890s, despite the association of tennis with upper-class whites, the sport began to attract athletes at black colleges and universities, such as the Tuskegee Institute and Howard University. Because the sport was segregated, blacks established their own tennis clubs around the Baltimore and Washington, D.C., areas to encourage players and create competitions, including Baltimore's Monumental Tennis Club and Washington, D.C.'s Association Tennis Club.

In response to the USTA prohibition against black players in their tournaments, a group of African-American businessmen, college professors, and physicians founded the ATA in Washington on November 30, 1916.  Their initial mission statement was to build the infrastructure for black tennis tournaments, to unite black players and fans, and to promote the game within African-American communities. The founders are listed as: Dr. Harry S. McCard, Dr. William H. Wright, Dr. B.M. Rhetta, Ralph Cook, Henry Freeman, and Tally Holmes.

In early tournaments hosted by the ATA, such popular black players as Margaret Peters, Roumania Peters, James Trouman, and Emanuel McDuffle competed. The first ATA National Championships were held the following August at Druid Hill Park in Baltimore, with competitions in men's singles, women's singles, and men's doubles. The earliest tournament recorded might be in early August 1922 at the Germantown, PA YWCA being billed as the "American Tennis Association National Championship Tennis Tournament.

The ATA partnered with prominent black colleges and universities to host their tournaments.  This ensured that the tournaments could provide the court time and housing for players and officials, particularly in the Jim Crow South where blacks were excluded from many public facilities and hotels. The colleges and clubs also had facilities for banquet halls and the types of large spaces that enabled the players and fans to organize politically around other issues, and provided space for high-profile events where the universities cultivated donors.

In the 1940s, there was a now famous match between Don Budge, the "white" singles champion at the time, and Jimmie McDaniel, the black champion at the time.  Held in Harlem, July 29, 1940, at the Cosmopolitan Tennis Club, in front of a capacity crowd of more than 2,000 patrons. Budge won [6-1, 6-2], but the color-barrier had been broken. Even Althea Gibson had quite a bit of involvement with the organization.

21st century ATA

Since 2013, the ATA has been negotiating with the City of Fort Lauderdale and Broward County to build a national training center and home for the Black Tennis Hall of Fame. The city and county were selected because of the preeminence of Sistrunk Boulevard, a historically black neighborhood. The interior of the Hall of Fame is slated to be designed by a Grand Slam Champion.

As part of the USTA’s partnership with the ATA, the National Campus will welcome the prestigious National Championships to its ground at least once every three to four years.

The 101st American Tennis Association National Championships were played at the USTA National campus between July 28 – August 4, 2018, with the final results posted.

The 102nd American Tennis Association National Championships were played in Ft. Lauderdale, Florida in 2021 with a full complement of black players.

Championships
First held in August 1917 at Druid Hill Park in Baltimore.

Men's singles
1917 Tally Holmes 
1918 Tally Holmes 
1920 Bertrand Clark 
1921 Tally Holmes 
1922 Edgar George Brown 
1923 Edgar George Brown 
1924 Tally Holmes 
1928 Edgar George Brown  
1929 Edgar George Brown 
Jimmy McDaniel
2018 Rodney Carey of Lake Park, Florida

Women's singles
1917 Lucy Slowe 
2018 Isabelle Porter of Jupiter, Florida

See also

 Tally Holmes, a founder
 United States Professional Tennis Association

References

External links
 Official website of American Tennis Association

1916 establishments in Maryland
African Americans and sport
Companies based in Culver City, California
Tennis organizations
Tennis in the United States
Sports organizations established in 1916
African-American organizations